The New Zealand cricket team toured Sri Lanka in August and September 2019 to play two Test and three Twenty20 International (T20I) matches. The Test series formed a part of the inaugural 2019–2021 ICC World Test Championship. The fixtures for the tour were confirmed in July 2019. Originally, the first two T20I matches were scheduled to be played at the R. Premadasa International Cricket Stadium in Colombo, but were moved to the Pallekele International Cricket Stadium in Kandy.

Sri Lanka Cricket named a twenty-two man squad for the Test series, which was trimmed down to the final fifteen cricketers. The Test series was drawn 1–1, with Sri Lanka winning the first match and New Zealand winning the second.

In the third and final T20I match, Sri Lanka's Lasith Malinga became the first bowler to take 100 wickets in Twenty20 International cricket. Malinga took a hat-trick, and four wickets with four balls, in the third over of his spell. He was the first bowler to take four wickets in four consecutive balls twice in international cricket, after previously doing so against South Africa in the 2007 Cricket World Cup. He also became the first bowler to take five hat-tricks across all formats of international cricket. Sri Lanka won the match, though New Zealand won the T20I series 2–1.

Squads

Dilruwan Perera was added to Sri Lanka's squad for the second Test. Lockie Ferguson was ruled out of New Zealand's T20I squad with a fractured thumb. Hamish Rutherford was added to New Zealand's T20I squad for the third match, after Martin Guptill was ruled out of the final fixture due to injury.

Tour matches

Three-day match: Sri Lanka Board Presidents XI vs New Zealand

Twenty-over match: Sri Lanka Board Presidents XI vs New Zealand

Test series

1st Test

2nd Test

T20I series

1st T20I

2nd T20I

3rd T20I

Statistics

Most runs (Test)

Most wickets (Test)

Most runs (T20I)

Most wickets (T20I)

Sri Lankan cricket team in Pakistan in 2019-20

References

External links
 Series home at ESPN Cricinfo

2019 in New Zealand cricket
2019 in Sri Lankan cricket
International cricket competitions in 2019
New Zealand cricket tours of Sri Lanka